Jeremiah Bey Ellison (born October 23, 1989) is an American politician and artist serving as a member of the Minneapolis City Council, representing Ward 5. Ellison is a member of the Minnesota Democratic–Farmer–Labor Party.

Early life 
Ellison was born and raised on the north side of Minneapolis. His father is Keith Ellison, a former member of the United States House of Representatives currently serving as the Attorney General of Minnesota.

Ellison began attending Juxtaposition Arts at age six. For high school, Ellison attended The Blake School where he played football and graduated in 2008. After attending college for one year, Ellison dropped out to focus on his art. He paints murals, teaches art, and has worked on comic books.

Career 
Ellison was arrested at a 2013 protest for a $15 minimum hourly wage. He became involved in the protests following the 2015 shooting of Jamar Clark. In December 2016, Ellison announced his candidacy for Minneapolis City Council in the November 2017 elections. Ellison defeated the incumbent councilmember, Blong Yang. As a councilmember, Ellison has advocated for greater protections for renters and has pushed the city to consider rent control. In 2020, Ellison spoke out against the murder of George Floyd and the actions taken by police in the subsequent George Floyd protests.

See also 

 George Floyd protests in Minneapolis–Saint Paul
 Police abolition movement in Minneapolis

References

External links

Living people
Politicians from Minneapolis
African-American city council members in Minnesota
Minneapolis City Council members
Minnesota Democrats
Artists from Minneapolis
21st-century American politicians
Date of birth missing (living people)
1989 births
21st-century African-American politicians
20th-century African-American people